Diagnostics of Karma is a series of 12 pseudoscientific books written by Sergey Nikolayevich Lazarev, a Russian researcher and writer in bioenergetics and healing. The books were featured on Russian and Ukrainian TV via interviews with their author.

Content of books and their purpose 

The twelve books embrace processes in the personal life of a human being, in politics, economics, ecology,  weather, religion, science. All the processes are shown by the author as inseparably connected.

According to Lazarev's research, our deep emotions directly shape our health and fate. As the author himself puts it, the quintessence of all his research can be reduced to one phrase: "The meaning of life is love for God." The author has it that love (in the absolute sense, objectless and subjectless) engenders time, and, indirectly, space and matter; that love is the absolute value.

Translations 

Eight books have been translated to German. Ten books have been translated to Polish as of 2009-2015. All twelve books from the series have been translated and published in Bulgarian. There are also a number of unauthorized Romanian translations, copies of which have found their way to the Toronto Public Library's catalogue.

In 2012 the first volume of Diagnostics of Karma The System of Field Self-regulation was translated to Spanish as Diagnosis del Karma. French translations of books two, three, four, and five are not yet published.

List of books' subtitles 

Along with the common title of Diagnostics of Karma, each book has its own subtitle.

Russian volumes
The System of Field Self-regulation (1993)
Clear Karma (1995)
Love (1996)
Touching the Future (1997)
Answers to Questions (1998)
Steps to the Divine (1999)
Overcoming Sensual Happiness (2001)
Dialogue with the Readers (2003)
Survival Manual (2003)
Continuing the Dialogue (2005)
Concluding the Dialogue (2005)
Life As a Flicker of a Butterfly's Wings (2007)
First step to the future

German volumes
Neue Sicht des Karma, Gesundheit und Schicksal als Ergebnis der eigenen Handlungen (2006)
Antworten auf Fragen zum Karma und zur Veränderung des eigenen Schicksals (2004)
Karmagesetze - Verbindung von Emotionen, Handlungen, Gedanken und vom Schicksal (2004)
Wie unsere Emotionen das Schicksal gestalten (2004)
Liebe (2007)
Kontakt mit der Zukunft (2008)

References

External links
Official Russian website
Official German website
Official Spanish website
 Official Bulgarian website
Collected Christian criticisms on Diagnostics of Karma
Critique by the Center for Apologetics Research

New religious movements